The United Kingdom's exclusive economic zone is the fifth largest in the world at . It comprises the exclusive economic zones surrounding the United Kingdom, the Crown Dependencies, and the British Overseas Territories. The figure does not include the EEZ of the British Antarctic Territory.

The UK was late to establish an EEZ, relying on overlapping maritime zones for fisheries, pollution control, and energy matters. The Marine and Coastal Access Act 2009 gave the powers to establish an EEZ, with the zone defined by The Exclusive Economic Zone Order 2013 which came into force on 31 March 2014.

The United Kingdom has not claimed an EEZ extending from Gibraltar or Akrotiri and Dhekelia.

Geography 

†Part of the overseas territory of Saint Helena, Ascension and Tristan da Cunha, which together has an EEZ of 1,641,294 square km.

Disputes 
The exclusive economic zones associated with the Falkland Islands, South Georgia and the South Sandwich Islands are disputed by Argentina. The EEZ of the Chagos Archipelago, also known as the British Indian Ocean Territory, is disputed by Mauritius, which considers the archipelago as a part of its territory. Gibraltar is disputed by Spain. Since the approval of Brexit in 2020 there have been disputes with the European Union about fishing rights in UK's territorial waters. The area around the uninhabitable island Rockall is also disputed.

See also 
 Geography of the United Kingdom
 Exclusive economic zone of France

References 

United Kingdom
Borders of the United Kingdom
Economy of the United Kingdom